John Carew (born 1979) is a Norwegian former footballer

John Carew may also refer to:

John Carew (Canadian politician) (1862–1927), lumber merchant and politician in Ontario, Canada
John Carew (Irish politician) (1901–1968), Irish Fine Gael politician
John Carew (regicide) (1622–1660), one of the regicides of King Charles I
John Carew (sprinter) (born 1952), sprint runner from Sierra Leone
John Edward Carew (1785–1868), Irish-born British sculptor
John F. Carew (1873–1951), U.S. Representative from New York
Sir John Carew, 3rd Baronet (1635–1692), English politician
John Carew (MP died 1545), MP for Poole (UK Parliament constituency)

See also
John Carew Eccles (1903–1997), Australian neurophysiologist
John Carew Rolfe (1859–1943), American classical scholar
Carew baronets
Carew (surname)